Frucht Quark, known in some European countries as "Dessert du Fromage Frais",  is a fromage frais based yogurt made by the Linessa brand, available through  Lidl stores in Europe including the United Kingdom and Germany.

It has 0.2% fat content. It is available in various flavours including cherry, vanilla, passion fruit, strawberry, and lime.

Brand name yogurts